AFL1-3603 (aka Dave Davies) is an album released in 1980 by Dave Davies featuring Davies performing all the instruments. The album (named after its own serial number) peaked at number 42 on the Billboard 200.

The album was favorably reviewed on Allmusic. James Chrispell wrote that "Dave Davies came out swinging with the great AFL1-3603" which "holds lots of power pop treasures, such as the very lovely 'Imaginations Real' and the nice change of pace 'Visionary Dreamer'."

Track listing
All songs written by Dave Davies

 "Where Do You Come From" – 3:42
 "Doing The Best for You" – 4:45
 "Visionary Dreamer" – 4:28
 "Nothin' More to Lose" – 4:09
 "The World is Changing Hands" – 2:55
 "Move Over" – 3:45
 "See the Beast" – 3:55
 "Imaginations Real" – 3:53
 "In You I Believe" – 3:17
 "Run" – 3:55

Personnel
Dave Davies - vocals, keyboards, guitar; bass guitar and drums on tracks 2-5, 8, 9
Ron Lawrence - bass guitar on tracks 1, 6, 7, 10
Nick Trevisick - drums on tracks 1, 6, 7, 10
Technical
Ben Fenner, John Rollo - engineer
J.J. Stelmach - art direction, design
Nick Sangiamo - photography

References

Dave Davies albums
Hard rock albums by English artists
1980 albums